James McEntee is a Gaelic footballer who plays at the back for the Meath county team. His cousin Shane plays ahead of him in midfield for Meath.

James McEntee's uncle Andy is manager of Meath.

References

Living people
Gaelic football backs
James
Meath inter-county Gaelic footballers
Year of birth missing (living people)